The KORA All Africa Music Awards are music awards given annually for musical achievement in sub-Saharan Africa. The awards were founded in 1994 by Benin born businessman, Ernest Adjovi, after a discussion in Namibia with the country's President Hage Geingob. The award is named after the kora, a West African plucked chordophone.

The awards have been subject to several postponements since 1994 with a variety of reasons given. Problems have arisen with contracts signed, large sums of monies have been paid and the event postponed.

In 2011 Adjovi was detained by the Nigerian Police Force with allegations he defrauded three Nigerian bodies. In 2008 Adjovi allegedly accepted [US]$2.5 million for the 2008 Awards to be hosted by the Cross River State Government. He later allegedly struck an agreement with the Lagos State Government for US$7.5 million but the awards were not staged until 2010 in Burkina Faso. At those awards brothers PSquare were named Artiste of the Year and were awarded a cash prize of $1 million but the prize was not forthcoming.

The 2015 awards were to be held 13 December in Namibia and a launch event was held in Namibia in May 2015. They were postponed to March 2016 and Adjovi was paid N$23,5 million. The awards did not take place and the whereabouts of Adovi is unknown. Namibia is trying to recover the money.

Since its inception, the KORA Awards has been staged eleven times on the African Continent. For the first ten years (1996-2005 - 9 Awards), the ceremony took place in South Africa. It has since moved to Burkina Faso (2010) and Côte d’Ivoire (2012).

Winners have come from many different countries: Algeria, Angola, Benin, Botswana, Burkina Faso, Burundi, Cameroon, Cape Verde, Comores, Côte d'Ivoire = Ivory Coast, Republic of the Congo = Congo, England, Ethiopia, France, Gabon, Ghana, Guinea, île de la Reunion, Kenya, Mali, Mauitius, Morocco, Nigeria, Democratic Republic of the Congo, Réunion, Rwanda, Senegal, Seyschelles, South Africa, Sweden, Tchad, Togo, Uganda, United States and Zimbabwe.

Winners

References 

African music awards